Hellinsia ochricostatus is a moth of the family Pterophoridae that is found in Colombia and Ecuador.

The forewings are shining white and the markings are brown. The hindwings are shining white and the fringes at the costa of the first lobe are dark grey, elsewhere they are white.

References

ochricostatus
Moths described in 1877
Moths of South America